Anthony Cyril Rudd (8 March 1923 – 22 August 2003) was a British engineer involved in aero engine design and motor racing, with particular associations with BRM and Lotus.

Early life and war service
Rudd became involved with motor racing in the 1930s when he became an informal assistant to Prince Chula and Prince Bira's White Mouse Racing team. This inspired him to take up engineering as a career and family influence led him to take up an apprenticeship at Rolls-Royce.

Rudd's engineering studies were interrupted by the Second World War during which he served in the Royal Air Force. Trained as a pilot, he flew Avro Lancasters on a tour of 30 operations. He became an expert in diagnosing failures in Merlin engines, but his main interest remained cars. Rudd resumed his engineering apprenticeship after the War and built an Aston Martin-based 'special'.

Career

Arrival at BRM 
The much-delayed BRM V16 engine was fitted with Rolls-Royce superchargers and Rudd was seconded to BRM in 1951 to assist with their development. He never returned to Rolls-Royce, becoming part of the BRM team for almost two decades. Rudd was involved in the development of the V16 and four-cylinder P25 cars and started to assume more prominence after the Rubery-Owen takeover of the team. Peter Berthon and Raymond Mays were eventually sidelined after the drivers threatened to strike and Rudd assumed full technical control of the team in 1960.

Successes at BRM 
Rudd put in place proper engineering procedures within the team. Rudd drove a monocoque Killeen car at Folkingham and increased his interest in vehicle rigidity. His spaceframe and monocoque V8-engined designs took BRM to 1 constructors' and 1 drivers' World Championships. However, his H-16 engine for the new three litre formula (based on two of the successful 1.5 litre V8s on top of each other) proved to be heavy and overcomplicated. The team struggled with the complex design and gradually lost momentum in the late Sixties. Rudd claims that the H-16 would have been successful had the drawings been followed accurately - as it was the engine had heavier castings than planned and its power-to-weight ratio was unfavourable; it also had breathing difficulties and only started to improve when it fired as a sixteen-cylinder engine rather than two eights. After abandoning the H-16, Rudd designed a compact V-12 that was to be the foundation of renewed success in the years after his departure from BRM. As a sideline to BRM's main development, Rudd and Peter Wright were also involved with the design of a ground effect car that never raced; driver John Surtees was adamant that it could not be made raceworthy. Rudd and Wright were later to be reunited at Lotus on work that did lead to successful ground-effect racing cars.

The move to Lotus 
During a poor 1969 season and after management changes at BRM, Rudd left for Lotus Cars, gradually working up to the position of Engineering Director on the road-car side of the company - he was not directly involved in racing, which Colin Chapman looked after. Rudd's achievements included the development of Lotus' own four-cylinder engine as well as improving production quality of their cars.
Rudd also developed Lotus as an engineering consultancy working on high-technology projects for the rest of the automotive industry, creating another profit centre within the business.

Ground effect and consultancy 
Team Lotus were struggling in the mid-1970s and Rudd led the research effort that produced ground effect Lotus 78, which brought the team back to the forefront of Grand Prix success. Rudd went back to the road-car side of the company to research active suspension, turbocharging, and lead consultancy work for other manufacturers.  After Chapman's death in 1982 Rudd took on an increasingly significant role in the business but advanced engineering remained his forté.

Final return to racing 
After the conviction of Fred Bushell for financial irregularities related to DeLorean, the Chapman family (who retained ownership of Team Lotus) asked Rudd to step in to head the racing team. He returned to racing for a year in 1989 until the team was sold on, then retired to become a freelance consulting engineer.

Retirement and writing 
In retirement, Rudd remained active in the Society of Automotive Engineers, wrote a widely acclaimed autobiography It Was Fun: My Fifty Years of High Performance and collaborated with Doug Nye on a multi-volume history of BRM.
Tony Rudd died in 2003 at the age of 80. He was married to Pamela and had three daughters.

Bibliography 
 BRM, Raymond Mays and Peter Roberts
 BRM: The Saga of British Racing Motors, Doug Nye with Tony Rudd, MRP - Volumes 1, 2 and 3 have appeared, covering the front-engined cars, spaceframe rear engined cars and monocoque V8 cars respectively; Volume 4 will cover the H16, V12s and Can-Ams.
 It Was Fun: My Fifty Years of High Performance, Tony Rudd, MRP.
 BRM V16, How Britain's auto makers built a Grand Prix car to beat the world, By Karl Ludvigsen, Published by Veloce

References

1923 births
2003 deaths
English racing drivers
British automobile designers
English motorsport people
Lotus Cars
Rolls-Royce people
Formula One designers
Royal Air Force pilots of World War II